Visit to a Chief's Son is a 1974 American adventure film directed by Lamont Johnson and starring Richard Mulligan and Johnny Sekka.

Plot
An American arthropologist and his son benefit from their experiences with an East African tribe.

Cast
 Richard Mulligan as Robert
 Johnny Sekka as Nermolok
 John Philip Hogdon as Kevin
 Jesse Kinaru as Codonyo
 Jock Anderson as Jock
 Chief Lomoiro as Chief

Discography
The CD soundtrack composed by Francis Lai is available on the Music Box Records label.

References

External links

1974 films
1970s adventure films
Films directed by Lamont Johnson
Films set in Kenya
United Artists films
Films scored by Francis Lai
American adventure drama films
1970s English-language films
1970s American films